Cholathadam is a rural area in Kottayam district in the state of Kerala in India. Flanked by Koottickal on the east and Vengathanam Estate / Chotty on the west.

Landmarks
This place consists of a church called St. Mary's Church, two temples, one nursery school, one DST Convent and the Gramodayam Library. Cholathadam consists of Cholathadam East, Chakkippara and Kaithakulam. The ancestors who got the land from the King of Poonjar Dynasty, cultivated there and made a good culture and civilization. The first ancestors are from the families of Vilakkunnel and Vadayattu. This is a place where Christians and Hindus live unitedly. The construction of the new church is completed by the leadership of Fr. Jose Keeranchira (Vicar) on 31 December 2014.

References

Villages in Kottayam district